Ece Temelkuran (born 22 July 1973, in Izmir) is a Turkish journalist and author. She was a columnist for Milliyet (2000–2009) and Habertürk (2009 January 2012), and a presenter on Habertürk TV (2010–2011). She was fired from Habertürk after writing articles critical of the government, especially its handling of the December 2011 Uludere massacre. She was twice named Turkey's "most read political columnist". Her columns have also been published in international media such as The Guardian and Le Monde Diplomatique.

A graduate of Ankara University's Faculty of Law, she has published 12 books, including two published in English (Deep Mountain, Across the Turkish-Armenian Divide, Verso 2010, and Book of the Edge, BOA Editions 2010). In 2008 she was a visiting fellow at the Reuters Institute for the Study of Journalism, during which time she wrote Deep Mountain, Across the Turkish-Armenian Divide. Her books include Ne Anlatayım Ben Sana! ("What am I Going to Tell You!", Everest, 2006), on hunger strikes by Turkish political prisoners. She was awarded the Human Rights Association of Turkey's Ayşe Zarakolu Freedom of Thought Award in 2008.

Her novel, Muz Sesleri ("Banana Sounds"), was published in 2010 and has been translated into Arabic and Polish.

In 2019, she published a nonfiction book How to Lose a Country: The 7 Steps from Democracy to Dictatorship, about the rise of right-wing populism and how it operates.

2021 saw the publication of her non-fiction book “Together:10 Choices for a Better Now” extolling the virtues of humanity and the need to be “together”.

Works 
 Book of the Edge : Poems translator Deniz Perin, Rochester, N.Y. : BOA Editions, 2010.  
 Turkey: the Insane and the Melancholy, translator Zeynep Beler, London : Zed Books, 2015. 
 Women Who Blow on Knots translator Alexander Dawe, Cardigan : Parthian Books, 2017. 
 Time of Mute Swans. Skyhorse Publishing Company, Incorporated, 2017.  
 How to Lose a Country: the 7 steps from democracy to dictatorship. Fourth Estate Ltd., 2019. 
 Together:10 Choices for a Better Now. Fourth Estate Ltd., 2021.

References

External links
 Ece Temelkuran (29 March 2020), "Corona-Neo-Fascism" as a deadly combo, Diem TV with Srecko Horvat, at 0:40:00.
 Ece Temelkuran (17 July 2016), "Yet again Turkey's children have awoken to darkness at dawn", The Guardian
 Ece Temelkuran (3 July 2016), "How My City Washes Away the Blood", The New York Times
 Recent English articles
 https://twitter.com/ETemelkuran

1973 births
Living people
People from İzmir
Turkish women journalists
Turkish women novelists
Turkish columnists
BirGün people
Milliyet people
Habertürk people
Turkish non-fiction writers
Turkish novelists
Bornova Anadolu Lisesi alumni
Ankara University Faculty of Law alumni
Turkish women columnists